Iris Racing is an auto racing team based in Switzerland. It is known under the name Iris Project in the International Formula Master series.

History

Single-seaters

References

External links
Official Website

Swiss auto racing teams
Formula Renault teams

Auto racing teams established in 2000